Juan Vicente Gómez International Airport , is an airport serving San Antonio del Táchira, in the Táchira state of Venezuela. In June 1993, it was renamed in honor of the early Venezuelan President Juan Vicente Gómez, who was from Táchira, in a ceremony presided over by interim President Ramón José Velásquez.

Airlines and destinations
As of 2023, there are no scheduled services at the airport.

See also
Transport in Venezuela
List of airports in Venezuela

References

External links
OurAirports - San Antonio Del Táchira Airport
San Antonio Del Táchira
OpenStreetMap - Juan Vicente Gómez Airport

Airports in Venezuela
Buildings and structures in Táchira